Erskine Nicol  (3 July 1825 – 1904) was a Scottish figure and genre painter.

Life
He was born in Leith on 3 July 1825 the eldest son of James Main Nicol and his wife Margaret Alexander. His father rented a property on Lochend Road and worked in a wine merchant (Wauchope & Moodie) at 133 Constitution Street. The family moved to Fife Place on Leith Walk in the 1830s.

After initial apprenticeship as a decorator he turned to art. He was a student at the Trustees' Academy on Picardy Place in Edinburgh, where he studied with Sir William Allan, and Thomas Duncan. On qualifying he initially taught as an Art Master at the old Leith High School.

Nicol taught in Dublin, Ireland, from 1845–50, at the height of the Irish famine, and identified with the oppression of the Irish people and much of his work portrays the injustices inflicted upon the Irish population during the 19th century. As well as everyday Irish life

In 1850, he moved back to Edinburgh. He lived at 1 Blenheim Place, a fine Georgian flat at the top of Leith Walk.
He was made an Associate of the Royal Scottish Academy in 1851 and an Academician in 1859. 

Nicol exhibited at the Royal Academy and was made an Associate of the Royal Academy in 1866.
He also exhibited at the Royal Hibernian Academy and the British Institution.

In 1862 he left Edinburgh and moved to St John's Wood in London, then in 1864 moved to 24 Dawson Place in west London. He also purchased a studio in Clonava in County Westmeath in Ireland and enjoyed finishing canvases there until ill-health forced him to curtail his travelling. He thereafter used a disused church in Pitlochry to complete his works.

He died at The Dell, Feltham in Middlesex, on 8 March 1904. He is buried with his second wife in Rottingdean.

In 1905 the Royal Scottish Academy held a commemorative exhibition.

Selected works

Wayside Prayers (1852; Tate, London)
Beggar My Neighbour (1855)
Irish Merry-Making (1856)
Donnybrook Fair (1856)
The Perch Fishers (1857)
The Approach of the Enemy (1859)
Portrait of Sir William Fettes Douglas (1862) Royal Scottish Academy
Renewal of the Lease Refused (1863)
Irish Emigrants Waiting for the Train (1864)
The Emigrants (1864; Tate, London)
A Deputation (1865)
Collecting His Thoughts (1865) Sheffield Museums
Both Puzzled (1866)
A Country Booking-Office (1867)
Making Pills for the Saxons (1868)
The Crossroads (1868)
Steady, Johnnie, Steady (1870)
Kept In (1871)
The Missing Boat (1877)

Family
Nicol was twice married: first in 1851 to Janet Watson, who died in 1863, leaving two sons (including John Watson Nicol (1856–1926), who became a painter) and a daughter; second in 1865 to Margaret Mary Wood, who survived him, and by whom he had two sons (the elder, Erskine Edwin Nicol, also became a painter) and a daughter.

Notes

References

External links

 
Erskine Nicol at Contemporary Irish Art
 Profile on Royal Academy of Arts Collections

1825 births
1904 deaths
Artists from Edinburgh
Scottish illustrators
19th-century Scottish painters
Scottish male painters
20th-century Scottish painters
Alumni of the Edinburgh College of Art
Associates of the Royal Academy
19th-century Scottish male artists
20th-century Scottish male artists